Shaanxi University of Chinese Medicine is located in Xianyang, the first capital of China in history. The university has two campuses, with a total area of 616024.4 m2. It was confirmed by the central government in 1978 to be one of the key universities for Chinese medicine, and was among the earliest medical universities that were authorized by the Ministry of Education in 1981 to grant master's degree.  (Note: The name “Shanxi University of Chinese Medicine” is a different university. "Shaanxi" and "Shanxi" are two provinces of China.)

History
The university was initially founded in Xi’an in 1952 as an institute for further education of Chinese medicine. It grew to Shaanxi University of Chinese Medicine in 1959. Its campus was relocated to Xianyang in 1961.

Colleges and Departments
College of Fundamental Medicine,
College of Clinical Chinese Medicine,
College of Chinese-Western Medicine,
College of Clinical Medicine,
College of Pharmacology,
College of Continuing Education,
Department of Acupuncture and Tui na,
Department of Nursing,
Department of Medical Techniques,
Department of Public Health,
Department of Human Science,
Department of English,
Department of P.E.,
Department of Social Science

Affiliates
2 directly affiliated hospitals,
7 non-directly affiliated hospitals,
1 manufacturer,
Museum of Shaanxi Medical History

Faculty
Total faculty members: 2300

Official website
Shaanxi University of Chinese Medicine

Universities and colleges in Shaanxi
Xianyang
1952 establishments in China
Educational institutions established in 1952